Martin Nielsen may refer to:

 Martin Nielsen (politician) (1900–1962), Danish politician
 Martin Møller Nielsen (born 1964), UK-based Danish billionaire
 Martin Nielsen (boxer) (born 1981), Danish boxer
 Martin Ulrich Nielsen (born 1973), Danish footballer and manager